Mowo is a town in Badagry, Lagos State, southwestern Nigeria. 
The town is just few kilometers from Seme Border with a populations of about 78,897.
Resident of the town are predominantly traders who often do businesses in the Seme border.
In December 2013, it was reported that 600 buildings erected on about 65 hectares of land were demolished by the Nigerian police.

References

Towns in Yorubaland
Populated places in Lagos State